Zózimo Bulbul (September 21, 1937 – January 24, 2013) was a Brazilian actor, filmmaker, and activist.  Bulbul was a prominent proponent of Afro-Brazilian culture within Brazilian cinema and society at-large. Bulbul co-founded and organized the Encontro de Cinema Negro Brasil, África & Américas, which showcases films featuring African and Afro-Brazilian actors, directors, and themes.

Bulbul made his film debut in the 1962 Brazilian motion picture, Cinco Vezes Favela. He went on to star in more than thirty films throughout his career, including Quilombo and  Sagarana: The Duel. Bulbul was also a filmmaker and film director. His best known work was his Abolição, which he released in 1988. Through Abolição, Bulbul explored the 100th anniversary of the abolition of slavery in Brazil. (Slavery was outlawed by the Lei Áurea in 1888).
 
Bulbul lived abroad in New York City during the height of the Brazilian dictatorship in the 1970s.

His life and work were depicted in the 2006 documentary Zózimo Bulbul. The film was directed by Lázaro Ramos as part of the Canal Brasil TV series Retratos Brasileiros.

Zózimo Bulbul died from a heart attack at his apartment in the Flamengo neighborhood of Rio de Janeiro on January 24, 2013, at the age of 75. He was survived by his wife of thirty years, Biza Vianna. He was buried at São Francisco Xavier cemetery in the Caju neighborhood of the city.

Filmography

References

External links

1937 births
2013 deaths
Afro-Brazilian people
Brazilian male film actors
Brazilian male television actors
Brazilian filmmakers
Brazilian film directors
Brazilian activists
Brazilian expatriates in the United States
Male actors from Rio de Janeiro (city)